Schnuffels Weihnachtslied (Schnuffel's Christmas song) is the fourth hit single released by Schnuffel, on 12 December 2008, by Sony BMG Germany (Sony BMG). The song debuted and peaked in Germany at No. 23 and is the 9th track of the album Winterwunderland. "ZEILT productions" was the producer of the 3D animation as seen in the official music video.

Track listing

"Schnuffels Weihnachtslied" – 2:45
"Zuckersternchen" – 3:28

International editions
 2008: Christmas song (English version) (by Snuggle) 
 2008: Canção de Natal (Portuguese version) (by Orelhinhas) 
 2008: ¡Llegó la Navidad! (Spanish version) (by Snufi) 
 2008: Vive Noël (French version) (by Lapin Câlin) 
 2008: La Canzone di Natale (Italian version) (by Kikolo) 
 2010: Χριστουγεννιάτικο τραγούδι (Greek version) (by Σνούφελ το λαγουδάκι / Snoufel to lagoudaki / Snoufel the bunny) 
 2013: Canção de Natal (Brazilian version) (by Coelhinho Schnuffel)

Charts

References

2008 singles
Schnuffel songs
2008 songs
Sony BMG singles